Jan Havel (born November 10, 1942, in Kolín, Bohemia and Moravia) is an ice hockey player who played for the Czechoslovak national team. He won a silver medal at the 1968 Winter Olympics.

References

External links

1942 births
HC Dukla Jihlava players
HC Sparta Praha players
HC Stadion Litoměřice players
Ice hockey players at the 1968 Winter Olympics
Living people
Medalists at the 1968 Winter Olympics
Olympic ice hockey players of Czechoslovakia
Olympic medalists in ice hockey
Olympic silver medalists for Czechoslovakia
Sportspeople from Kolín
Czech ice hockey forwards
Czechoslovak ice hockey forwards